John Trenchwas an eighteenth-century English Anglican priest in Ireland: he was educated at Magdalen Hall, Oxford and was Dean of Raphoe  from 21 January 1692 until his death on 24 June 1725.

References

17th-century Irish Anglican priests
18th-century Irish Anglican priests
Deans of Raphoe

Alumni of Magdalen Hall, Oxford

17th-century births
Year of birth unknown
1725 deaths